Fiji Tuwawa is an online Fijian company that specializes in Pacific research and community consultancy. Their vision is to be the leading interactive Fijian site online and to "unite everyone and their links to Fiji". Their mission is to "network the people of Fiji and to provide a forum of sharing our own stories, linking us back to Fiji."

The company website contains information about Fiji's past and present history which were written by indigenous Fijians. Research had been undertaken in the areas of archaeology and anthropology, with the support of researchers around the world.

External links
Fiji Tuwawa

Note: The above article information was extracted from their online website. Permission had been granted by Kalisito Vunidilo, one of their main directors .

Companies of Fiji